The Tripoli Grand Prix (Italian: Gran Premio di Tripoli) was a motor racing event first held in 1925 on a racing circuit outside Tripoli, the capital of what was then Italian Tripolitania, now Libya. It lasted until 1940.

Background

Motor racing was an extremely popular sport in Italy and the colony was seeking methods to raise capital and promote tourism—tourists who, it was hoped, would then decide to settle in Tripolitania.  But despite the support of the colony's extremely enthusiastic governor, General Emilio de Bono, and some initial success, the events failed financially.  Only personal intervention by General de Bono kept the 1929 event from being cancelled, and 1930 was marred by a spartan field, little public interest, and the death of Gastone Brilli-Peri in an accident. Initial enthusiasm and sponsorship had retreated, the fallout from Brilli-Peri's accident meant a 1931 running was impossible, and the dream of a successful Tripoli Grand Prix might have ended there and then.

But the president of Tripoli's auto club, Egidio Sforzini, was resilient.  He decided to organize another Grand Prix, this time on a purpose built European style racing circuit.  Sufficient capital was raised from the Italian government's funding of a fair promoting the colony so as to make the venture possible, and upon the circuit's completion the Grand Prix was scheduled for the spring of 1933.

This new Mellaha Lake track was a 13.140 kilometer (8.165 mi) long affair situated in a salt basin between Tripoli, Suq al Jum'ah (also known as Suk el Giuma or Sugh el Giumaa (سوق الجمعة)) and Tajura and around the Mellaha Air Base.  The track's most distinctive landmark was a brilliant white concrete tower situated across from a large frontstretch grandstand that could hold up to ten thousand people. Mellaha Lake was equipped with starting lights, an innovation, and the additional amenities rivaled the best that continental European circuits had to offer.

With Italy exerting further control over its North African holdings, including the appointment of Marshal of the Air Force Italo Balbo as Governor-General and the joining of Italian Cyrenaica and Italian Tripolitania into a single colony, Libya, the event gained even more spectacle.  The participants were treated like royalty, staying in luxury at the Hotel Uaddan with its casino and dinner theater and being entertained by Marshal Balbo at his palace.  All this led driver Dick Seaman to describe Mellaha Lake as the "Ascot of motor racing circuits", and coupled with its substantial total prize, it is easy to see why the Tripoli Grand Prix became such a popular date on the calendar.

From 1933 to 1938, the Grand Prix was run to the Formula Libre standard, meaning that no weight or engine restrictions were enforced on what was then the fastest track in the world.  In 1939 the Italians, tired of Germany's dominance, turned it into a Voiturette race for smaller, 1500cc cars, but  even so a specially-built Mercedes driven by Hermann Lang won. In 1940, with only the factory Alfa Romeo and Maserati teams plus some independents in attendance, Giuseppe Farina took his only major pre-war victory.  It was a last and pyrrhic result for the Italians, because the Tripoli Grand Prix was never held again with the onset of World War II.

1933 – Accusation of corruption 
The Grand Prix was held in conjunction with the Libyan state lottery and, in the case of the inaugural Mellaha Lake event, there have long been accusations of result fixing. From October 1932 to 16 April 1933, the government sold 12 lire lottery tickets and, after taking their cut, they put up the rest as the prize for a special lottery based on the outcome of the race. Thirty attendance tickets were drawn at random eight days before the event and assigned to a corresponding race entry. The holder of the winner's entry would receive three million lire, second place two million, and third one million. The story, first publicized in Alfred Neubauer's 1958 book Speed Was My Life (Männer, Frauen und Motoren: Die Erinnerungen des Mercedes-Rennleiters), alleged that Tazio Nuvolari, Achille Varzi and Baconin Borzacchini, along with their respective ticket holders, conspired to decide the outcome of the race in order to split some seven and a half million lire together. Research suggests that the story is a popular myth.

Winners

By year

See also
 Italian Libya
 Mellaha Air Base, the airbase that was built inside the circuit.
Mitiga International Airport

External links
Grand Prix History, Gran Premio di Tripoli
Grand Prix History, Triumph: A Victor's Report

References

Auto races in Italy
Auto races in Libya
Sport in Tripoli, Libya
Pre-World Championship Grands Prix
Motorsport in Africa
Recurring sporting events established in 1925
Recurring sporting events disestablished in 1940
Auto racing controversies